Gopinathan is a name which was used in Southern States of India like Kerala, Tamil Nadu, Karnataka and Andhra Pradesh in the 1950s and 1960s among the progressive Hindu families. The name is derived from the Lord Krishna, who is considered to be a hero in protecting young girls. He is called Nathan, meaning the Gopika's' (Girls') dream hero. The name lost its prominence to modern names since the 1970s.

Given name 
Notable people with Gopinathan as a given name include:

 Gopinathan Ramachandra (born 1989), a Malaysian footballer
 Gopinathan Pillai (1921–2002), an Indian politician

Surname 
Notable people with Gopinathan as a surname include:

 Rajesh Gopinathan
 K. Gopinathan
 Lekshmi Gopinathan
 P. Gopinathan Nair
 P. Gopinathan
 Indumati Gopinathan
 Asha Gopinathan

Surnames
Indian masculine given names
Tamil masculine given names